Admiral George Ramsay, 12th Earl of Dalhousie  (26 April 1806 – 20 July 1880), known as George Ramsay until 1874, was a British naval officer.

Career
Ramsay was the son of Lieutenant-General the Honourable John Ramsay (1775–1842), fourth son of George Ramsay, 8th Earl of Dalhousie. He served in the Royal Navy from 1820 and was appointed a Companion of the Order of the Bath in 1856. He served as Commander-in-Chief of the South East Coast of America Station from 1866 to 1869 and was promoted to the rank of admiral in 1875. He succeeded his cousin, Fox Maule-Ramsay, 11th Earl of Dalhousie, in the earldom in 1874. In 1875, he was created Baron Ramsay, of Glenmark in the County of Forfar, in the Peerage of the United Kingdom.

Dalhousie's fourth son the Honourable Charles Maule Ramsay was a soldier and politician. Dalhousie died in July 1880, aged 74, and was succeeded by his eldest son, John.

See also

References

External links

|-

1806 births
1880 deaths
Royal Navy admirals
Earls of Dalhousie
Companions of the Order of the Bath
George
Peers of the United Kingdom created by Queen Victoria